Experimental Film Society is an Ireland-based film production, distribution company and video-on-demand streaming service specialising in experimental cinema. The film company has so far produced over 50 feature films and 500 short films, organised more than 150 screenings worldwide and led its own film festival Luminous Void: Experimental Film Festival.

History 
Founded by Rouzbeh Rashidi, the Experimental Film Society originated in 2000 in Tehran, Iran and expanded to Dublin in 2004. In the early stages, the company was a member-based not-for-profit film collective specialising in avant-garde, experimental and low-budget filmmaking. While employing new international members, the group emphasised film archiving, restoring and programming by underground filmmakers. By 2011, the collective put the initiative into organising screenings, performances and talks worldwide. In 2017, EFS officially became a production and distribution company facilitating professionally funded projects. The year 2020 marked the two decades of the existence Experimental Film Society and the culmination of the company's multidisciplinary work. The group is often referred to as "the most active, prolific and intrepid group of experimental filmmakers working in Ireland today" (aemi).

EFS Publications

Luminous Void: Experimental Film Society Documents 
Luminous Void: Experimental Film Society Documents was published in 2017. The book, as suggested in the name, chronicles the history of modern underground cinema by assembling a series of writings, interviews and manifestos that examine the concepts that arise from EFS filmmaking.

Luminous Void: Twenty Years of Experimental Film Society 
In December 2020, Experimental Film Society Publications launched their Luminous Void: Twenty Years of Experimental Film Society with Adrian Martin as a guest speaker. The second book comments on the activities of twenty years of existence of EFS from an external viewpoint, focusing more on the film criticism of the group's filmography and essays on film theory.

Reference 

Film production companies of Iran